Lagus of Eordaia (Greek Λάγος, Lagos; lived 4th century BC) was a Macedonian courtier and the father of Ptolemy, the founder of the Ptolemaic dynasty. He married Arsinoe of the Argead dynasty and a concubine of Philip II, king of Macedon, who was said to have been pregnant at the time of their marriage, forming the basis of Ptolemy as the son of Philip; but it is possible that this is a later myth fabricated to glorify the Lagid dynasty (Ptolemaic). From an anecdote recorded by Plutarch, it is clear that Lagus was a man of obscure birth; hence, when Theocritus calls Ptolemy a descendant of Heracles, he probably means to represent him as the son of Philip. Lagus is believed by some to have subsequently married Antigone, niece of Antipater, by whom he became the father of Berenice, afterwards the wife of Ptolemy, but this is based on a misreading of a corrupt scholium; her father's name was almost certainly Magas.

Lagus (Lykaionike)
Lagus (son of Ptolemy), winner in Synoris Arcadian Lykaia 308 BC, may be a relative of Lagus family.

References
Smith, William (editor); Dictionary of Greek and Roman Biography and Mythology, "Lagus (1)", Boston, (1867)

Notes

Ancient Macedonians
Ptolemaic dynasty
Ancient Eordaeans
4th-century BC Greek people
4th-century BC Macedonians